Pavel Anatolyevich Kolobkov (born 22 September 1969) is a retired Russian (and formerly Soviet) épée fencer. He won one gold, two silver and three bronze medals at five Olympic Games from 1988 to 2004. He served as the Minister of Sport in the Russian government from 2016 to 2020. He also previously served as the Deputy Minister of Sport as well as Deputy Minister of Sport, Tourism and Youth Policy.

Biography
Kolobkov was born on 22 September 1969 in Moscow.
In his career he won 27 medals between Olympic Games, World and European Championships. He was appointed as a Deputy Minister of Sport, Tourism and Youth Policy on 8 October 2010 by then Prime Minister Vladimir Putin. He was appointed as the head of the Russian delegation for 2012 Summer Olympics in London on 9 August 2011.

On 18 June 2012, he was appointed as the Deputy Minister of Sports. He was appointed as a Class 3 State Advisor of the Russian Federation on 7 October 2013.

Kolobkov also served as Russia's representative to the World Anti-Doping Agency. His last meeting with the organization was on 18 November 2015 when it declared the Russian Anti-Doping Agency as non-compliant. As a result, he lost his position as representative to the organization in January 2016 and was barred from serving on the organization's Foundation Board.

He was appointed as a Class 2 State Advisor of the Russian Federation on 11 August 2016. On 19 October, he was appointed as the Minister of Sport in Dmitry Medvedev's Cabinet in place of the previous minister Vitaly Mutko (who was promoted to Deputy Prime Minister) by President Putin.

On 15 January 2020, he resigned as part of the cabinet, after President Vladimir Putin delivered the Presidential Address to the Federal Assembly, in which he proposed several amendments to the constitution. On 21 January, he was replaced by Oleg Matytsin. In March 2020, Kolobkov was appointed as a board member and the Deputy chief executive officer for Federal Government Relations by Gazprom Neft.

Achievements

Olympic Games
 Épée individual (2000)
 Épée individual (1992) and Épée team (1996)
 Épée individual (2004) and Épée team (1988, 1992)

World Championships
 Épée individual (1993, 1994, 2002, 2005) and Épée team (2003)
 Épée individual (1997) and Épée team (2002)
 Épée individual (1989, 1999) and Épée team (1988)

European Championships
 Épée individual (1996, 2000)
 Épée individual (2002, 2003, 2005) and Épée team (2006)
 Épée individual (1999, 2001, 2004, 2006) and Épée team (1998)

Fencing World Cup
  Épée (1999)

Awards and honors

 Order of Honour – Awarded on 19 April 2001
 Awarded the honorary rank of colonel by the Russian Armed Forces on 20 November 2004.
 Merited Master of Sports – Received in 1992
 Medal of the Order "For Merit to the Fatherland" 1st and 2nd class
 Russian Federation Presidential Certificate of Honour

See also
Multiple medallist at the World Fencing Championships

References

External links
 
  (archive)
 
 
  
 Pavel Kolobkov profile

1969 births
Living people
Soviet male fencers
Russian male épée fencers
Olympic fencers of the Soviet Union
Olympic fencers of the Unified Team
Olympic fencers of Russia
Fencers at the 1988 Summer Olympics
Fencers at the 1992 Summer Olympics
Fencers at the 1996 Summer Olympics
Fencers at the 2000 Summer Olympics
Fencers at the 2004 Summer Olympics
Olympic bronze medalists for the Soviet Union
Olympic silver medalists for the Unified Team
Olympic bronze medalists for the Unified Team
Olympic gold medalists for Russia
Olympic silver medalists for Russia
Olympic bronze medalists for Russia
Olympic medalists in fencing
Martial artists from Moscow
Medalists at the 1988 Summer Olympics
Medalists at the 1992 Summer Olympics
Medalists at the 1996 Summer Olympics
Medalists at the 2000 Summer Olympics
Medalists at the 2004 Summer Olympics
Universiade medalists in fencing
Russian sportsperson-politicians
Universiade gold medalists for the Soviet Union
21st-century Russian politicians
World Anti-Doping Agency members
Medalists at the 1991 Summer Universiade
Medalists at the 1993 Summer Universiade
Medalists at the 1995 Summer Universiade
Kutafin Moscow State Law University alumni